Patia is a genus of butterflies in the subfamily Dismorphiinae. They are native to the Americas.

Species
 Patia cordillera (C. Felder & R. Felder, 1862)
 Patia orise (Boisduval, 1836)
 Patia rhetes (Hewitson, [1857])

References

External links

 
images representing Patia cordillera sororna at Consortium for the Barcode of Life

Dismorphiinae
Pieridae of South America
Pieridae genera
Taxa named by Alexander Barrett Klots